The New Girl is the first novel in R. L. Stine's Fear Street series. It was written in 1989, making it one of the earliest horror novels written by Stine. The New Girl is one of twelve Fear Street books that were reprinted in 2005.

Plot Summary
Cory falls in love with Anna, the new girl at his high school. But as he attempts to learn more about her he finds that his friends don't recognize her, he can't find her in the school files, and a phone call to her family home results in someone on the other end insisting Anna is dead.

Cory visits Anna's house on Fear Street where he is met by a man who, again, insists that she is dead. A few nights later, Anna calls him asking to meet her, implying she needs his help. He's convinced she's real by her humanlike kisses. 

After another girl asks Cory to the prom, she finds a dead cat in her locker with a warning note attached to its neck. She suspects Anna, but Cory stands by her. At the dance Lisa is pushed down a flight of stairs by Anna's brother, Brad, who escapes capture after seeing that Lisa survived the fall.

Cory travels to Anna's house to confront Brad soon after, where he found Anna and Brad fighting. It is revealed that Anna is actually Willa, Anna's sister who had killed her out of jealousy and assumed her identity. Cory and Brad manage to subdue "Anna" and call the police. At the end, it is implied that Cory begins a relationship with Lisa.

Reception
The School Library Journal commented "the vocabulary is simple, the premise interesting, and the plot compelling, making this book one for reluctant readers." However, Publishers Weekly described this book as "a tame offering." R. J. Carter from The Trades commented that it was "a fine example of the crazed killer tales that teens love to spook each other with in the wee hours of the night."

References

External links

 R. L. Stine's Official Website.

Fear Street
1989 American novels
American horror novels
Proms in fiction